Waltraud Strotzer ( Pöhland, born 16 September 1952 in Wünschendorf/Elster) is a German middle distance runner who specialized in the 800 metres.

As a teenager she won the silver medal at the 1968 European Junior Championships and the gold medal at the 1970 European Junior Championships. She also competed at the European Championships in 1966, 1969 and 1971 without reaching the final.

In domestic competitions, she represented the sports club SC Motor Jena. She became East German indoor champion in 1970 and 1971. In 1975 she became 1500 metres champion.

References

1952 births
Living people
East German female middle-distance runners